Gaétan Royer (born March 13, 1976) is a Canadian former professional ice hockey right winger.

Biography
Royer was born in Donnacona, Quebec. As a youth, he played in the 1990 Quebec International Pee-Wee Hockey Tournament with a minor ice hockey team from Sainte-Foy, Quebec City. He played three games in the National Hockey League with the Tampa Bay Lightning in the 2001–02 season, going scoreless. In 2008, Royer played for the Bartercard Gold Coast Blue Tongues in the Australian Ice Hockey League (AIHL).

Career statistics

References

External links

1976 births
Beauport Harfangs players
Canadian ice hockey right wingers
French Quebecers
Gold Coast Blue Tongues players
Grand Rapids Griffins (IHL) players
Ice hockey people from Quebec
Indianapolis Ice players
Jackson Bandits players
Jacksonville Lizard Kings players
Living people
Kalamazoo Wings (1974–2000) players
Muskegon Lumberjacks players
Pensacola Ice Pilots players
People from Capitale-Nationale
Saint John Flames players
Sherbrooke Faucons players
Springfield Falcons players
Saint-Georges Cool FM 103.5 players
Tampa Bay Lightning players
Undrafted National Hockey League players